Par Kuh may refer to:
 Par Kuh, Hormozgan
 Par Kuh, Mazandaran